The FAI Youth Cup, also known as the FAI Umbro Youth Challenge Cup, is a cup competition organised by the FAI for youth association football clubs and teams in the Republic of Ireland. The inaugural winners were Greenmount Rangers. The competition's most successful club has been Home Farm who have won the cup eleven times. They have also been finalists on a further seven occasions. In 1964–65 a Home Farm A team, featuring Terry Conroy and Billy Newman, played a Home Farm B team in the final at Tolka Park. The cup is currently sponsored by Umbro.

List of finals

Notes

References

Youth association football in the Republic of Ireland
1934 establishments in Ireland
4
Youth Cup